Song of Nevada is a 1944 American musical Western film directed by Joseph Kane, and starring Roy Rogers and Dale Evans.

Plot
Rancher John Barrabee is upset his daughter doesn't want to stay in the West; instead, she is a New York City nightclub singer who is engaged to marry shady playboy Rollo Bingham. Travelling back west, Barrabee's plane makes an emergency landing in Nevada and awaits another airplane that brings them parts  needed to repair the aircraft. Barrabee wanders off and meets trail boss Roy Rogers and the Sons of the Pioneers. Happy he is back roping and riding with fellow cowboys, he misses his plane's departure, and joins Roy in droving cattle.

After the cattle drive, Barrabee discovers he is presumed dead as his plane crashed with no survivors. Barrabee uses the opportunity to get Roy to straighten out his daughter.

Cast 
 Roy Rogers as Roy Rogers
 Trigger as Trigger, Roy's Horse
 Dale Evans as Joan Barrabee
 Mary Lee as Kitty Hanley
 Lloyd Corrigan as Professor Hanley
 Thurston Hall as John Barrabee
 John Eldredge as Rollo Bingham
 Forrest Taylor as Colonel Jack Thompson
 George Meeker as Chris Calahan
 Emmett Vogan as Master of Ceremonies
 LeRoy Mason as Ferguson
 Bob Nolan as Bob
 Sons of the Pioneers as Musicians
 Helen Talbot as the Stewardess

Soundtrack 
 "It's Love, Love, Love" (Written by Mack David, Joan Whitney and Alex Kramer)
 "New Moon Over Nevada" (Written by Ken Carson)
 "A Cowboy Has to Yodel in the Morning" (Written by Ken Carson)
 "Hi Ho Little Dogies" (Written by Glenn Spencer)
 "The Wigwam Song" (Written by Glenn Spencer)
 "Nevada" (Written by Charles Henderson)
 "What Are We Going to Do?" (Written by Charles Henderson)
 "Harum Scarum Baron of the Harmonium" (Written by Charles Henderson)
 "And Her Golden Hair Was Hanging Down Her Back" (Written by Felix McGlennon and Monroe Rosenfeld)
 "Scrub Scrub" (Written by Smiley Burnette)

External links 
 
 

1944 films
1944 Western (genre) films
1940s English-language films
American black-and-white films
American Western (genre) films
Republic Pictures films
Films directed by Joseph Kane
1940s American films